LuK Challenge Chrono was a road bicycle race held annually as a team time trial for pairs in Bühl, Germany. In 2005 and 2006, the race was organized as a 1.1 event on the UCI Europe Tour. After 2006, the sponsor, LuK, withdrew as part of Germany's general disengagement from cycling amidst a number of doping scandals, and the race did not take place again.

Winners

External links
Official website 

Cycle races in Germany
Recurring sporting events established in 1968
1968 establishments in West Germany
Defunct cycling races in Germany
Men's road bicycle races
Recurring sporting events disestablished in 2006
Sport in Baden-Württemberg
2006 disestablishments in Germany